Eren Şen (born 28 September 1984 in Hamburg) is a German-Turkish football player.

He started his playing career in the youth teams of FSV Harburg, later joining FC St. Pauli and Hamburger SV, and made his debut in professional football in 2003 for Hamburger SV. Later he played for FC Thun in Switzerland where he played in the UEFA Champions League and UEFA Cup. In 2006, he joined Turkish club Konyaspor, staying on until 2009 when he left for Diyarbakırspor. Due to a long-time injury and financial troubles, he played in only seven matches for his last club and eventually returned to Germany for both treatment and rehabilitation. 
After training with Hamburger SV II to stay fit, Eren Şen signed a contract with Regionalliga Nord side 1. FC Magdeburg that will keep him at the club until 2011, with an option to extend the contract for another year, however, this contract was dissolved in December due to dissatisfaction with the situation on both sides.

Honours
Hamburger SV
DFL-Ligapokal: 2003

References

External links

 Eren Şen Interview

1984 births
Living people
German footballers
German people of Turkish descent
Konyaspor footballers
Diyarbakırspor footballers
FC Thun players
Hamburger SV players
Hamburger SV II players
1. FC Magdeburg players
Mersin İdman Yurdu footballers
Süper Lig players

Association football midfielders
Footballers from Hamburg